The Criminal Code of Finland is the codification of the central legal source concerning criminal law in Finland.

History
The Criminal Code came into effect in 1894, and it has been modified numerous times since then.

See also 
Law enforcement in Finland

References
Note: Since English is not an official language in Finland, the English translations of Finnish legislation at finlex.fi are unofficial but used by the Finnish Ministry of Justice.

Law of Finland
Finland